Roger Kjendalen (born 6 June 1965) is a Norwegian handball player. He played 242 matches and scored 930 goals for the Norway men's national handball team between 1985 and 1998.  He participated at the 1993 World Men's Handball Championship.

While playing for SG Flensburg-Handewitt, he won the EHF Cup with the club in 1997.

References

1965 births
Living people
Norwegian male handball players